Atala may refer to:
 152 Atala, an asteroid
 Atala (company), an Italian manufacturer of bicycles
 Atala (cycling team), sponsored by the bicycle manufacturer
 Atala (district), a district in Tampere, Finland
 Atala (novella), a novella by François-René de Chateaubriand
Atala, Dominican Republic
 Eumaeus atala, a species of butterfly
 Atala, fictional training master in The Hunger Games trilogy by Suzanne Collins
 Saint Attala, also known as Abbot Atala, medieval monk of Bobbio (died 622)
 Atala, pen name of poet Léonise Valois (1868–1936)

See also
 Attala (disambiguation)
 Atalla (disambiguation)
 Atallah (disambiguation)
 Atila (disambiguation)
 Atula, a Sanskrit-language poet